The Rhodesia National Party (RNP) was a political party in Rhodesia and was the successor and right wing of the United Federal Party (UFP). The Rhodesia National Party adhered to the policies of the U.F.P; which, included the abolition of the Land Apportionment Act and the prohibition of racially discriminatory practices.

History
The Rhodesia National Party was founded in 1961 as the right wing of the United Federal Party, and in 1963 The UFP split and the party was the Southern Rhodesian successor to the UFP and was led by Edgar Whitehead the 6th premier of Southern Rhodesia. Whitehead was unanimously elected as the party president in October 1963, ending an attempted takeover by Roy Welensky supporters.  The party had about 29 MPs which included 14 Africans. In 1963 the party did not support the effort of independence of Southern Rhodesia, but soon reversed their decision and that it was indeed prepared to discuss a united demand for independence with the Government.

References

Political parties in Rhodesia
Political parties established in 1961
1961 establishments in Southern Rhodesia
Conservative parties in Zimbabwe